Ladislav Lábus (born 21 November 1951 in Prague) is a Czech architect and university teacher. He is brother of the Czech actor Jiří Lábus.

References

External links 
 Interview with short biography (in Czech)
 Photo
 Short biography (in Czech)

Czech architects
1951 births
Living people